Marrying the Mafia III is a 2006 South Korean film.

Plot
This gangster comedy chronicles the White Tiger Family of Jeolla Province. Hong Deok-ja, head of the crime family, quits the syndicate to open a kimchi business after her son marries a prosecutor. She is pulled back into the crime family when the familiar member of the rival Axe Gang is released from prison and seeks revenge upon the White Tiger Family.

Cast
 Shin Hyun-joon as Jang In-jae
 Tak Jae-hoon as Jang Seok-jae
 Kim Soo-mi as Hong Deok-ja
 Kim Won-hee as Kim Jin-gyeong / Park Jin-sook
 Gong Hyung-jin as Bong Myeong-pil
 Shin Yi as Oh Soon-nam
 Park Hee-jin as Doctor
 Im Hyung-joon as Jang Kyeong-jae
 Jeong Jun-ha as Jong-myeon
 Kim Yong-gun as Jang Jeong-jong
 Kim Hae-gon as Yun Do-shik

See also
 Marrying the Mafia
 Marrying the Mafia II
 Marrying the Mafia IV

References

External links
 
 
 

2000s crime comedy films
Films about organized crime in South Korea
South Korean sequel films
Showbox films
Films directed by Jeong Yong-ki
2000s Korean-language films
South Korean crime comedy films
2000s South Korean films